Rudolf Bolling Teusler M.D. (1876 - 1934) was a medical physician and lay missionary to Japan who worked under the auspices of the Foreign and Domestic Missionary Society of the American Episcopal Church.

Teusler is remembered in Japan as the founding physician, chief fundraiser and administrative head of St. Luke's International Hospital, an institution founded in 1902, that continues to operate as a high profile hospital and medical teaching facility in central Tokyo. He is also remembered for his pioneering work in the establishment of Japan's first college of nursing, as well as for public health, child welfare and preventative medicine programs.

Early life and career
Teusler was born in Rome, Georgia, and grew up in Richmond, Virginia. A cousin of First Lady of the United States, Edith Bolling Galt Wilson. A graduate of the Medical College of Virginia at the age of 18 in 1894.  He went on to complete post graduate studies and internships at Bellevue Hospital New York, and other hospitals in Baltimore, Montreal and Quebec.  He then returned to Richmond as an Assistant Professor of Pathology and Bacteriology at the Medical College of Virginia.

With encouragement from his brother-in-law, Rev. Edmund Lee Woodward M.D., a medical missionary to Anqing, China, Teusler and his wife Mary first set out for Japan in 1900, as the fourth medical physician and lay missionary appointed to that country under the auspices of the American Episcopal Church. As an active member of the Nippon Sei Ko Kai, Teusler organized and headed the Tokyo Chapter of the Brotherhood of St. Andrew, an Anglican men's group devoted to Bible study and active lay ministry.

In addition to founding St. Luke's international Hospital in Tokyo in 1902, Teusler is renowned for establishing the first professional training school for nurses in Japan, with his superintendent of nurses, Iyo Araki. Due to Teusler's reputation as a gifted surgeon and skill as an administrator and fundraiser, the hospital grew and expanded rapidly.  Teusler's many supporters in the United States generously contributed for a complete rebuilding of the hospital facilities in the wake if the Great Kantō earthquake in 1923. Teusler was also a far sighted hospital administrator; by always choosing to surround himself with western-trained Japanese staff such as Dr. Kawase Motokuro and Araki Iyo as Head Nurse, he ensured that the hospital had sufficiently Japanese roots to enable it to flourish long after his eventual retirement.

With the rank of Lt Colonel, Teusler also served as a Commissioner of the Red Cross, with Allied Forces in Vladivostok, Siberia from 1918 - 1921. In this capacity he organized field hospitals and medical teams across Siberia supplying medical relief to Czech, Slovak, and White Russian forces as they sought, unsuccessfully, to halt the advance of the Red Army.

Awards and recognition

Teusler was awarded the Fifth Star of the Order of the Rising Sun by the Japanese Government for his contributions to public health and the development of modern medical practice in Japan. He was also awarded the Russian medal of St. Vladimir and the Czechoslovak war medal for his assistance in the evacuation of injured Czech prisoners of war from Vladivostok.

References

American Anglican missionaries
Anglican missionaries in Japan
1876 births
1934 deaths
American expatriates in Japan
Christian medical missionaries